Staircase ceiling in the Rashid Diab Arts Center

Rashid Diab (Wad Madani, Sudan, 1957) is a Sudanese modern painter, visual artist and art historian.

Life and artistic career 
Diab studied at the College of Fine and Applied Art in Khartoum, from which he graduated in 1978 with honours. Sponsored by a scholarship from the government of Spain, he continued his studies at the Complutense University of Madrid, and submitted his PhD thesis on the ‘Philosophy of Sudanese Art’ in 1991.

Back in Khartoum since 1999, Diab has been active as a painter, art teacher and director of his own artistic center. His work has been widely exhibited and included in private collections.

The Encyclopedia of African History describes Diab's colourful style as an exemplification of the generation of artists that followed Sudanese pioneers like Ibrahim El Salahi of the School of Khartoum and "developed a more universal aesthetic, that merges Western, African, and Islamic influences and expresses cultural identity in a global context."

Gallery

See also 

 Visual arts of Sudan

References

Further reading 

 Daum, Werner and Rashid Diab, Modern Art in Sudan, In Hopkins, Peter G. (ed.) (2009) Kenana Handbook of Sudan. New York: Routledge, pp. 453–516,

External links

Living people
1957 births
Sudanese artists
Sudanese painters
Complutense University of Madrid alumni
20th-century Sudanese painters
Sudanese contemporary artists